Lakeview Shock Incarceration Correctional Facility is a minimum security shock incarceration prison in New York in the United States.  The prison is located in the Village of Brocton, in Chautauqua County, New York. The facility provides special treatment for non-violent offenders.

The mission of New York State Corrections and Community Supervision is “to improve public safety by
providing a continuity of appropriate treatment services in safe and secure facilities where inmates’
needs are addressed and they are prepared for release, followed by supportive services for all parolees
under community supervision to facilitate a successful completion of their sentence”. In July 1987, New
York State established the Shock Incarceration Program through legislation, which mandated that the
Department of Corrections and Community Services (DOCCS) create a six-month program that would
prepare young, non-violent inmates for early release consideration. Lakeview Shock Incarceration Correctional Facility is like a boot camp or military style that intended to shock an offender into changing
poor behavioral patterns.

Lakeview Shock Incarcerated Correction Facility offer several programs to give inmates the tools to
maintain a healthy and sober lifestyle once released on parole. Staff conducts one mandated program, the
Alcohol Substance Abuse Treatment/Network program (ASAT), and held one-day per week and one evening per week with each platoon; and every other week the ASAT Network also facilitates a confrontation group. Documentation showed that community meetings are at least weekly. In addition, Network staff conducts one Network class per week with each platoon. Information reviewed indicates that
community meetings are observed daily. According to information reviewed, in all, inmates receive over
570 hours of ASAT/Network programming while they participate in the Shock Incarceration Program.
Lakeview Shock Academic Education program includes 12 hours of weekly academic study where every
student spends two three-hour modules once a week and three-hour evening classes twice a week. InPREA Audit Report Page 8 of 110 Lakeview Shock Incarceration
C.F.
mates are able to obtain their General Education Diploma (GED) through the education program.
The Vocational Education Program at Lakeview Shock Incarceration Correctional Facility consists of
trade shops. Vocational programs are provided in two modules four days a week (three hours each module) and two nights per week (three hours each night) or two modules five days a week (Three hours each
module). Each shop has a capacity of 19-20 inmates to attend each of the modules. Lakeview offers seven
vocational programs including: Custodial Maintenance, Computer Operator/Digital Literacy & MOS Certification, Building Maintenance, Floor Covering, Horticulture, Painting & decorating, and Upholstery.

References

External links  
  NY prison information

Prisons in New York (state)
Buildings and structures in Chautauqua County, New York